Glipa novaguineae is a species of beetle in the genus Glipa. It was described in 1952.

References

novaguineae
Beetles described in 1952